Louxing District is the only urban district and the seat of Loudi Prefecturel-level City, Hunan Province, China.

Located in northeastern part of Loudi, it is in the place across three prefecturel-level cities of Loudi, Changsha and Xiangtan, the Lian River flows it west to east. Louxing District is bordered to the west by Ningxiang County, to the east by Xiangxiang City, to the southeast by Shuangfeng County, to the southwest and the west by Lianyuan City. Louxing District has seven subdistricts, five towns and a township under its jurisdiction, the government seat is Louxing Community of Changqing Subdistrict.

History
From Song dynasty to Ming dynasty, the place of modern district of Louxing was a part of Chang'an Town in Xiangxiang County. The township of Chang'an was divided into two townships of Chang'an and Shentong in 1896. The township of Shentong was reorganized to Shentong Town in 1912. Xiangxiang was divided into ten districts in 1930, the modern district of Louxing was a part of the 9th district. Through the adjustment and amalgamation of subdivisions of Xiangxiang County in 1934, there were four townships of Fengle, Yunxia, Leshan and Yanfu in the region of modern Louxing. There were four townships of Fengle, Yunxia, Leshan and Yanfu, and the town of Loudi in the region of modern Louxing in 1949.

The district of Louxing is originally the county-level city of Loudi was formed by seven communes from Lianyuan County (the modern Lianyuan City) in January 1961, which was under the administration of Shaoyang Prefecture. The county-level city of Loudi ceased to be a separate city and was merged with Lianyuan in October 1962.

Lianyuan Prefecture was formed from part of Shaoyang Prefecture in September 1977, its seat was Loudi Town in Lianyuan County. The county-level city of Loudi was reformed and was the seat of Lianyuan Prefecture in July 1980. Lianyuan Prefecture was renamed to Loudi Prefecture named after its seat in December 1982. The Loudi Prefecture ceased to be as a prefecture, it was replaced by the prefecture-level city of Loudi, meanwhile the county-level city of Loudi was renamed to Louxing District on January 20, 1999.

Shuidongdi Town from Lianyuan City and Shexingshan Town from Shuangfeng County were transferred to Louxing District on January 24, 2017. It has 16 towns, five townships and seven subdistricts under jurisdiction.

Subdivisions
Shuidongdi Town from Lianyuan City and Shexingshan Town from Shuangfeng County were transferred to Louxing District on January 24, 2017. It has five towns, one township and seven subdistricts under jurisdiction.

7 subdistricts
 Changqing
 Dabuqiao
 Dake
 Huangnitang
 Huashan
 Leping
 Lianbin

5 towns
 Shanshan
 Shexingshan
 Shijing
 Shuidongdi
 Wanbao

a township
 Shuangjiang

Tourist attraction
Shima Park a renowned botanical garden and scenic spot integrating scientific research & popularization and tourism in Louxing District.

External links 
 Official Website

References
www.xzqh.org 

 
Loudi
County-level divisions of Hunan